The 2018–19 San Diego Toreros men's basketball team represented the University of San Diego during the 2018–19 NCAA Division I men's basketball season. The Toreros were led by first-year head coach Sam Scholl. They played their home games at Jenny Craig Pavilion in San Diego, California as members of the West Coast Conference. They finished the season 21-15, 7-9 to finish in 7th place. As the No. 7 seed in the WCC Tournament, they defeated Portland, Santa Clara and BYU to advance to the semifinals where they lost to Saint Mary’s. They received an at-large bid to the NIT where they lost in the first round to Memphis.

Previous season
The Toreros finished the 2017–18 season 20–14, 9–9 in WCC play to finish in a three-way tie for fourth place. They lost to BYU in the quarterfinals of the WCC tournament. The Toreros were invited to the CollegeInsider.com Tournament where they defeated Hartford in the first round, in a game referred to as the Riley Wallace Classic, and Portland State in the second round before losing in the quarterfinals to Northern Colorado.

On March 8, 2018, head coach Lamont Smith, who had been placed on administrative leave following an arrest for domestic violence 10 days earlier, resigned as head coach. Assistant coach Sam Scholl took over as acting head coach for the Toreros during the WCC Tournament and the CIT. On April 2, the school announced Scholl would remain the head coach.

Offseason

Departures

2018 recruiting class

2019 recruiting class

Roster

Schedule and results

|-
!colspan=12 style=| Non-conference regular season

|-
!colspan=12 style=| WCC regular season

|-
!colspan=9 style=| WCC tournament

|-
!colspan=9 style=| NIT

See also
 2018–19 San Diego Toreros women's basketball team

References

San Diego Toreros men's basketball seasons
San Diego
San Diego Toreros
San Diego Toreros
San Diego